Martin Reichardt (born 30 July 1969) is a German politician. Born in Goslar, Lower Saxony, he represents Alternative for Germany (AfD). Martin Reichardt has served as a member of the Bundestag from the state of Saxony-Anhalt since 2017. He is chairmen of AfD Saxony-Anhalt.

Life 
He became member of the bundestag after the 2017 German federal election. He is a member of the Committee for Family, Senior Citizens, Women and Youth and the Committee for Education, Research and Technology Assessment.

References

External links 

 Bundestag biography 

1969 births
Living people
Members of the Bundestag for Saxony-Anhalt
Members of the Bundestag 2021–2025
Members of the Bundestag 2017–2021
Members of the Bundestag for the Alternative for Germany